NGC 5223 is an elliptical galaxy in the constellation of Canes Venatici. It was discovered on 1 May 1785 by William Herschel.

References

Notes

External links
 

Elliptical galaxies
Canes Venatici
5223
08553
47822